The 1953–54 Serie A season was the 21st season of the Serie A, the top level of ice hockey in Italy. Eight teams participated in the league, and HC Milan Inter won the championship.

Regular season

External links
 Season on hockeytime.net

1953–54 in Italian ice hockey
Serie A (ice hockey) seasons
Italy